Rangaswamy Peak and Pillar is a rocky column in Kotagiri, The Nilgiris, Tamil Nadu. It is located at a distance of 20 km from Kotagiri.

Rangaswamy Peak
This is the most sacred place for the Irulas who hold it as the home of the deity Rangaswamy. It is also known as Rangabottu and hosts an annual harvest-fertility festival. It was in this region that a DC-3 Air India plane carrying the statistician Abraham Wald crashed on 13 December 1950.

Rangaswamy Pillar
Rangaswamy Pillar is found on the north west side of Rangaswamy Peak. The height of the pillar is about 400 feet.

See also
 Kotagiri
 Ooty
 Coonoor

References

Tourist attractions in Nilgiris district
Mountains of Tamil Nadu
Mountains of the Western Ghats